Garry Peters (born November 26, 1991) is an American professional gridiron football defensive back for the BC Lions of the Canadian Football League (CFL).

College career
Peters attended Clemson University from 2011 to 2014, where he played college football for the Tigers. He played in 45 games, including 17 starts, where he had 106 tackles, two interceptions, two sacks, two forced fumbles, and one fumble recovery.

Professional career

Carolina Panthers
Peters was signed as an undrafted free agent on May 8, 2015, by the Carolina Panthers of the National Football League (NFL) after going undrafted in the 2015 NFL Draft. However, he was released prior to the start of preseason on July 30, 2015.

Edmonton Eskimos
Peters signed with the Edmonton Eskimos on May 29, 2016. He made the team's active roster following training camp and made his professional debut on June 25, 2016, against the Ottawa Redblacks. After spending time on the injured list, he played in 11 regular season games with the team and had 24 defensive tackles and five special teams tackles.

In 2017, Peters was suspended for one game after making physical contact with an official during a game against the Hamilton Tiger-Cats. His season was also limited by injury and he played in just eight regular season games where he had 35 defensive tackles and three special teams tackles. He became a free agent upon the expiry of his contract on February 13, 2018.

BC Lions
On February 13, 2018, Peters signed with the BC Lions. He played in all 18 regular season games where he had a career-high 73 defensive tackles to go along with two interceptions, one sack, and one forced fumble. In 2019, Peters again played in all 18 games and had 63 defensive tackles, four interceptions, and one forced fumble. He signed a two-year contract extension on February 11, 2020, but did not play that year due to the cancellation of the 2020 CFL season.

In a shortened 2021 season, Peters played in all 14 regular season games where he recorded 46 defensive tackles and four special teams tackles. As a pending free agent, he signed a contract extension on February 1, 2022.

References

External links
BC Lions profile

1991 births
Living people
People from Conyers, Georgia
Sportspeople from the Atlanta metropolitan area
Players of American football from Georgia (U.S. state)
American football defensive backs
Clemson Tigers football players
Carolina Panthers players
American players of Canadian football
Canadian football defensive backs
Edmonton Elks players
BC Lions players